The UK encryption ban is a pledge by former British prime minister David Cameron to ban online messaging applications that offer end-to-end encryption, such as WhatsApp, iMessage, and Snapchat, under a nationwide surveillance plan. Cameron's proposal was in response to the services which allow users to communicate without providing the UK security services access to their messages, which in turn could allegedly allow suspected terrorists a safe means of communication.

Proposal
On 15 January 2015, David Cameron asked American president Barack Obama to increase pressure on American Internet companies to work more closely with British intelligence agencies, in order to deny potential terrorists a "safe space" to communicate, as well as seeking co-operation to implement tighter surveillance controls. Under new proposals, messaging apps will have to either add a backdoor to their programs, or risk a potential ban within the UK. To justify the proposal to ban encryption, David Cameron claims that "In our country, do we want to allow a means of communication between people, which even in extremis, with a signed warrant from the home secretary personally, that we cannot read?" In defending surveillance of Internet messaging, Cameron pointed out that the British state already possessed the legal ability to read people's private letters and to surveil their private phone calls.

In July 2016, newly appointed home secretary Amber Rudd confirmed the proposed Investigatory Powers Bill would grant any Secretary of State the powers to force communication service providers to remove or disable end-to-end encryption.

Criticism
The UK's Information Commissioner Christopher Graham criticized the plans by saying "We must avoid knee-jerk reactions. In particular, I am concerned about any compromising of effective encryption for consumers of online services." The ISPA claims that the proposal risks "undermining the UK's status as a good and safe place to do business". While David Cameron had also claimed that app providers have "a social responsibility to fight the battle against terrorism", the founder of Lavabit had also criticized the proposals, saying the introduction of backdoors would leave systems more vulnerable.

Resultant legislation

The resulting legislation was the Investigatory Powers Act 2016 (nicknamed the Snoopers' Charter) which comprehensively sets out and in limited respects expands the electronic surveillance powers of the UK Intelligence Community and police. It also aims to improve the safeguards on the exercise of those powers.

See also
Mass surveillance in the United Kingdom
Internet censorship in the United Kingdom
Web blocking in the United Kingdom

References

External links
U.K. PM Backpedals On ‘Encryption Ban’, Sort Of
Cameron wants to ban encryption – he can say goodbye to digital Britain
Here's Why Britain's Proposed Encryption Ban Is Totally Unworkable
David Cameron in 'cloud cuckoo land' over encrypted messaging apps ban 
Banning all encryption won't make us safer, no matter what David Cameron says
David Cameron Wants To Ban Encryption

Internet censorship in the United Kingdom